Progressive rock (shortened as prog rock or simply prog; sometimes conflated with art rock) is a broad genre of rock music that developed in the United Kingdom and United States through the mid- to late 1960s, peaking in the early 1970s. Initially termed "progressive pop", the style was an outgrowth of psychedelic bands who abandoned standard pop traditions in favour of instrumentation and compositional techniques more frequently associated with jazz, folk, or classical music. Additional elements contributed to its "progressive" label: lyrics were more poetic, technology was harnessed for new sounds, music approached the condition of "art", and the studio, rather than the stage, became the focus of musical activity, which often involved creating music for listening rather than dancing.

Progressive rock is based on fusions of styles, approaches and genres, involving a continuous move between formalism and eclecticism. Due to its historical reception, the scope of progressive rock is sometimes limited to a stereotype of long solos, long albums, fantasy lyrics, grandiose stage sets and costumes, and an obsessive dedication to technical skill. While the genre is often cited for its merging of high culture and low culture, few artists incorporated literal classical themes in their work to any great degree, and only a handful of groups, such as Emerson, Lake & Palmer, purposely emulated or referenced classical music.

The genre coincided with the mid-1960s economic boom that allowed record labels to allocate more creative control to their artists, as well as the new journalistic division between "pop" and "rock" that lent generic significance to both terms. It saw a high level of popularity in the early-to-mid-1970s, but faded soon after. Conventional wisdom holds that the rise of punk rock caused this, but several more factors contributed to the decline. Music critics, who often labelled the concepts as "pretentious" and the sounds as "pompous" and "overblown", tended to be hostile towards the genre or to completely ignore it. After the late 1970s, progressive rock fragmented in numerous forms. Some bands achieved commercial success well into the 1980s (albeit with changed lineups and more compact song structures) or crossed into symphonic pop, arena rock, or new wave.

Early groups who exhibited progressive features are retroactively described as "proto-prog". The Canterbury scene, originating in the late 1960s, denotes a subset of progressive rock bands who emphasised the use of wind instruments, complex chord changes and long improvisations. Rock in Opposition, from the late 1970s, was more avant-garde, and when combined with the Canterbury style, created avant-prog. In the 1980s, a new subgenre, neo-progressive rock, enjoyed some commercial success, although it was also accused of being derivative and lacking in innovation. Post-progressive draws upon newer developments in popular music and the avant-garde since the mid-1970s.

Definition and characteristics

Scope and related terms

The term "progressive rock" is synonymous with "art rock", "classical rock" (not to be confused with classic rock), and "symphonic rock". Historically, "art rock" has been used to describe at least two related, but distinct, types of rock music. The first is progressive rock as it is generally understood, while the second usage refers to groups who rejected psychedelia and the hippie counterculture in favour of a modernist, avant-garde approach. Similarities between the two terms are that they both describe a mostly British attempt to elevate rock music to new levels of artistic credibility. However, art rock is more likely to have experimental or avant-garde influences. "Prog" was devised in the 1990s as a shorthand term, but later became a transferable adjective, also suggesting a wider palette than that drawn on by the most popular 1970s bands.

Progressive rock is varied and is based on fusions of styles, approaches, and genres, tapping into broader cultural resonances that connect to avant-garde art, classical music and folk music, performance and the moving image. Although a unidirectional English "progressive" style emerged in the late 1960s, by 1967, progressive rock had come to constitute a diversity of loosely associated style codes. When the "progressive" label arrived, the music was dubbed "progressive pop" before it was called "progressive rock", with the term "progressive" referring to the wide range of attempts to break with standard pop music formula. A number of additional factors contributed to the acquired "progressive" label: lyrics were more poetic; technology was harnessed for new sounds; music approached the condition of "art"; some harmonic language was imported from jazz and 19th-century classical music; the album format overtook singles; and the studio, rather than the stage, became the focus of musical activity, which often involved creating music for listening, not dancing.

Critics of the genre often limit its scope to a stereotype of long solos, overlong albums, fantasy lyrics, grandiose stage sets and costumes, and an obsessive dedication to technical skill.  While progressive rock is often cited for its merging of high culture and low culture, few artists incorporated literal classical themes in their work to any great degree, and only a handful of groups purposely emulated or referenced classical music.  Writer Emily Robinson says that the narrowed definition of "progressive rock" was a measure against the term's loose application in the late 1960s, when it was "applied to everyone from Bob Dylan to the Rolling Stones". Debate over the genre's criterion continued to the 2010s, particularly on Internet forums dedicated to prog.

According to musicologists Paul Hegarty and Martin Halliwell, Bill Martin and Edward Macan authored major books about progressive rock while "effectively accept[ing] the characterization of progressive rock offered by its critics. ... they each do so largely unconsciously." Academic John S. Cotner contests Macan's view that progressive rock cannot exist without the continuous and overt assimilation of classical music into rock. Author Kevin Holm-Hudson agrees that "progressive rock is a style far more diverse than what is heard from its mainstream groups and what is implied by unsympathetic critics."

Relation to art and social theories

In early references to the music, "progressive" was partly related to progressive politics, but those connotations were lost during the 1970s. On "progressive music", Holm-Hudson writes that it "moves continuously between explicit and implicit references to genres and strategies derived not only from European art music, but other cultural domains (such as East Indian, Celtic, folk, and African) and hence involves a continuous aesthetic movement between formalism and eclecticism". Cotner also says that progressive rock incorporates both formal and eclectic elements, "It consists of a combination of factors – some of them intramusical ('within), others extramusical or social ('without')."

One way of conceptualising rock and roll in relation to "progressive music" is that progressive music pushed the genre into greater complexity while retracing the roots of romantic and classical music. Sociologist Paul Willis believes: "We must never be in doubt that 'progressive' music followed rock 'n' roll, and that it could not have been any other way. We can see rock 'n' roll as a deconstruction and 'progressive' music as a reconstruction." Author Will Romano states that "rock itself can be interpreted as a progressive idea ... Ironically, and quite paradoxically, 'progressive rock', the classic era of the late 1960s through the mid- and late 1970s, introduces not only the explosive and exploratory sounds of technology ... but traditional music forms (classical and European folk) and (often) a pastiche compositional style and artificial constructs (concept albums) which suggests postmodernism."

History

1966–1970: Origins

Background and roots

In 1966, the level of social and artistic correspondence among British and American rock musicians dramatically accelerated for bands like the Beatles, the Beach Boys and the Byrds who fused elements of cultivated music with the vernacular traditions of rock. Progressive rock was predicated on the "progressive" pop groups from the 1960s who combined rock and roll with various other music styles such as Indian ragas, oriental melodies and Gregorian chants, like the Beatles and the Yardbirds. The Beatles' Paul McCartney said in 1967: "we [the band] got a bit bored with 12 bars all the time, so we tried to get into something else. Then came Dylan, the Who, and the Beach Boys. ... We're all trying to do vaguely the same kind of thing." Rock music started to take itself seriously, paralleling earlier attempts in jazz (as swing gave way to bop, a move which did not succeed with audiences). In this period, the popular song began signalling a new possible means of expression that went beyond the three-minute love song, leading to an intersection between the "underground" and the "establishment" for listening publics.

Hegarty and Halliwell identify the Beatles, the Beach Boys, the Doors, the Pretty Things, the Zombies, the Byrds, the Grateful Dead and Pink Floyd "not merely as precursors of progressive rock but as essential developments of progressiveness in its early days". According to musicologist Walter Everett, the Beatles' "experimental timbres, rhythms, tonal structures, and poetic texts" on their albums Rubber Soul (1965) and Revolver (1966) "encouraged a legion of young bands that were to create progressive rock in the early 1970s". Dylan's poetry, the Mothers of Invention's album Freak Out! (1966) and the Beatles' Sgt. Pepper's Lonely Hearts Club Band (1967) were all important in progressive rock's development. The productions of Phil Spector were key influences, as they introduced the possibility of using the recording studio to create music that otherwise could never be achieved. The same is said for the Beach Boys' Pet Sounds (1966), which Brian Wilson intended as an answer to Rubber Soul and which in turn influenced the Beatles when they made Sgt. Pepper.

Dylan introduced a literary element to rock through his fascination with the Surrealists and the French Symbolists, and his immersion in the New York City art scene of the early 1960s. The trend of bands with names drawn from literature, such as the Doors, Steppenwolf and the Ides of March, were a further sign of rock music aligning itself with high culture. Dylan also led the way in blending rock with folk music styles. This was followed by folk rock groups such as the Byrds, who based their initial sound on that of the Beatles. In turn, the Byrds' vocal harmonies inspired those of Yes, and British folk rock bands like Fairport Convention, who emphasised instrumental virtuosity. Some of these artists, such as the Incredible String Band and Shirley and Dolly Collins, would prove influential through their use of instruments borrowed from world music and early music.

Pet Sounds and Sgt. Pepper

Pet Sounds and Sgt. Pepper, with their lyrical unity, extended structure, complexity, eclecticism, experimentalism, and influences derived from classical music forms, are largely viewed as beginnings in the progressive rock genre and as turning points wherein rock, which previously had been considered dance music, became music that was made for listening to. Between Pet Sounds and Sgt. Pepper, the Beach Boys released the single "Good Vibrations" (1966), dubbed a "pocket symphony" by Derek Taylor, the band's publicist. The song contained an eclectic array of exotic instruments and several disjunctive key and modal shifts. Scott Interrante of Popmatters wrote that its influence on progressive rock and the psychedelic movement "can't be overstated". Martin likened the song to the Beatles' "A Day in the Life" from Sgt. Pepper, in that they showcase "the same reasons why much progressive rock is difficult to dance to".

Although Sgt. Pepper was preceded by several albums that had begun to bridge the line between "disposable" pop and "serious" rock, it successfully gave an established "commercial" voice to an alternative youth culture and marked the point at which the LP record emerged as a creative format whose importance was equal to or greater than that of the single. Bill Bruford, a veteran of several progressive rock bands, said that Sgt. Pepper transformed both musicians' ideas of what was possible and audiences' ideas of what was acceptable in music. He believed that: "Without the Beatles, or someone else who had done what the Beatles did, it is fair to assume that there would have been no progressive rock." In the aftermath of Sgt. Pepper, magazines such as Melody Maker drew a sharp line between "pop" and "rock", thus eliminating the "roll" from "rock and roll" (which now refers to the 1950s style). The only artists who remained "rock" would be those who were considered at the vanguard of compositional forms, far from "radio friendly" standards, as Americans increasingly used the adjective "progressive" for groups like Jethro Tull, Family, East of Eden, Van der Graaf Generator and King Crimson.

Proto-prog and psychedelia

According to AllMusic: "Prog-rock began to emerge out of the British psychedelic scene in 1967, specifically a strain of classical/symphonic rock led by the Nice, Procol Harum, and the Moody Blues (Days of Future Passed)." The availability of newly affordable recording equipment coincided with the rise of a London underground scene at which the psychedelic drug LSD was commonly used. Pink Floyd and Soft Machine functioned as house bands at all-night events at locations such as Middle Earth and the UFO Club, where they experimented with sound textures and long-form songs. Many psychedelic, folk rock and early progressive bands were aided by exposure from BBC Radio 1 DJ John Peel. Jimi Hendrix, who rose to prominence in the London scene and recorded with a band of English musicians, initiated the trend towards guitar virtuosity and eccentricity in rock music.  The Scottish band 1-2-3, later renamed Clouds, were formed in 1966 and began performing at London clubs a year later. According to Mojo George Knemeyer: "some claim [that they] had a vital influence on prog-rockers such as Yes, The Nice and Family."

Symphonic rock artists in the late 1960s had some chart success, including the singles "Nights in White Satin" (the Moody Blues, 1967) and "A Whiter Shade of Pale" (Procol Harum, 1967). The Moody Blues established the popularity of symphonic rock when they recorded Days of Future Passed together with the London Festival Orchestra, and Procol Harum began to use a greater variety of acoustic instruments, particularly on their 1969 album A Salty Dog. Classical influences sometimes took the form of pieces adapted from or inspired by classical works, such as Jeff Beck's "Beck's Bolero" and parts of the Nice's Ars Longa Vita Brevis. The latter, along with such Nice tracks as "Rondo" and "America", reflect a greater interest in music that is entirely instrumental. Sgt. Pepper's and Days both represent a growing tendency towards song cycles and suites made up of multiple movements.

Focus incorporated and articulated jazz-style chords, and irregular off-beat drumming into their later rock based riffs, and, several bands that included jazz-style horn sections appeared, including Blood, Sweat & Tears and Chicago. Of these, Martin highlights Chicago in particular for their experimentation with suites and extended compositions, such as the "Ballet for a Girl in Buchannon" on Chicago II. Jazz influences appeared in the music of British bands such as Traffic, Colosseum and If, together with Canterbury scene bands such as Soft Machine and Caravan. Canterbury scene bands emphasised the use of wind instruments, complex chord changes and long improvisations. Martin writes that in 1968, "full-blown progressive rock" was not yet in existence, but three bands released albums who would later come to the forefront of the music: Jethro Tull, Caravan and Soft Machine.

The term "progressive rock", which appeared in the liner notes of Caravan's 1968 self-titled debut LP, came to be applied to bands that used classical music techniques to expand the styles and concepts available to rock music. The Nice, the Moody Blues, Procol Harum and Pink Floyd all contained elements of what is now called progressive rock, but none represented as complete an example of the genre as several bands that formed soon after. Almost all of the genre's major bands, including Jethro Tull, King Crimson, Yes, Genesis, Van der Graaf Generator, ELP, Gentle Giant, Barclay James Harvest and Renaissance, released their debut albums during the years 1968–1970. Most of these were folk-rock albums that gave little indication of what the bands' mature sound would become, but King Crimson's In the Court of the Crimson King (1969) and Yes’ self-titled debut album (1969) were early, fully-formed examples of the genre.

1970s–1980s

Peak years (1971–1976) 

Most of the genre's major bands released their most critically acclaimed albums during the years 1971–1976. The genre experienced a high degree of commercial success during the early 1970s. Jethro Tull, ELP, Rush, Yes and Pink Floyd combined for four albums that reached number one in the US charts, and sixteen of their albums reached the top ten. Mike Oldfield's Tubular Bells (1973), an excerpt of which was used as the theme for the film The Exorcist, sold 16 million copies.

Progressive rock came to be appreciated overseas, but it mostly remained a European, and especially British, phenomenon. Few American bands engaged in it, and the purest representatives of the genre, such as Starcastle and Happy the Man, remained limited to their own geographic regions. This is at least in part due to music industry differences between the US and Great Britain. Cultural factors were also involved, as US musicians tended to come from a blues background, while Europeans tended to have a foundation in classical music. North American progressive rock bands and artists often represented hybrid styles such as the complex arrangements of Todd Rundgren's Utopia and Rush, the hard rock of Captain Beyond, the Southern rock-tinged prog of Kansas, the jazz fusion of Frank Zappa and Return to Forever, and the eclectic fusion of the all-instrumental Dixie Dregs. British progressive rock acts had their greatest US success in the same geographic areas in which British heavy metal bands experienced their greatest popularity. The overlap in audiences led to the success of arena rock bands, such as Boston, Kansas, and Styx, who combined elements of the two styles.

Progressive rock achieved popularity in Continental Europe more quickly than it did in the US. Italy remained generally uninterested in rock music until the strong Italian progressive rock scene developed in the early 1970s. Progressive rock emerged in Yugoslavia in the late 1960s, dominating the Yugoslav rock scene until the late 1970s. Few of the European groups were successful outside of their own countries, with the exceptions of Dutch bands like Focus and Golden Earring who wrote English-language lyrics, and the Italians Le Orme and PFM, whose English lyrics were written by Peter Hammill and Peter Sinfield, respectively. Some European bands played in a style derivative of English bands. The "Kosmische music" scene in Germany came to be labelled as "krautrock" internationally and is frequently cited as part of the progressive rock genre or an entirely distinct phenomenon. Krautrock bands such as Can, which included two members who had studied under Karlheinz Stockhausen, tended to be more strongly influenced by 20th-century classical music than the British progressive rock bands, whose musical vocabulary leaned more towards the Romantic era. Many of these groups were very influential even among bands that had little enthusiasm for the symphonic variety of progressive rock.

Progressive soul 

Concurrently, African-American popular musicians drew from progressive rock's conceptual album-oriented approach. This led to a progressive-soul movement in the 1970s that inspired a newfound sophisticated musicality and ambitious lyricism in black pop. Among these musicians were Sly Stone, Stevie Wonder, Marvin Gaye, Curtis Mayfield, and George Clinton. In discussing the development, Martin cites 1970s albums by Wonder (Talking Book, Innervisions, Songs in the Key of Life), War (All Day Music, The World Is a Ghetto, War Live), and the Isley Brothers (3 + 3), while noting that the Who's progressive rock-influenced Who Are You (1978) also drew from the soul variant. Dominic Maxwell of The Times calls Wonder's mid-1970s albums "prog soul of the highest order, pushing the form yet always heartfelt, ambitious and listenable".

Decline and fragmentation

Political and social trends of the late 1970s shifted away from the early 1970s hippie attitudes that had led to the genre's development and popularity. The rise in punk cynicism made the utopian ideals expressed in progressive rock lyrics unfashionable. Virtuosity was rejected, as the expense of purchasing quality instruments and the time investment of learning to play them were seen as barriers to rock's energy and immediacy. There were also changes in the music industry, as record companies disappeared and merged into large media conglomerates. Promoting and developing experimental music was not part of the marketing strategy for these large corporations, who focused their attention on identifying and targeting profitable market niches.

Four of progressive rock's most successful bands – King Crimson, Yes, ELP and Genesis – went on hiatus or experienced major personnel changes during the mid-1970s. Macan notes the September 1974 breakup of King Crimson as particularly significant, calling it the point when "all English bands in the genre should have ceased to exist". More of the major bands, including Van der Graaf Generator, Gentle Giant and U.K., dissolved between 1978 and 1980. Many bands had by the mid-1970s reached the limit of how far they could experiment in a rock context, and fans had wearied of the extended, epic compositions. The sounds of the Hammond, Minimoog and Mellotron had been thoroughly explored, and their use became clichéd. Those bands who continued to record often simplified their sound, and the genre fragmented from the late 1970s onwards. In Robert Fripp's opinion, once "progressive rock" ceased to cover new ground – becoming a set of conventions to be repeated and imitated – the genre's premise had ceased to be "progressive".

The era of record labels investing in their artists, giving them freedom to experiment and limited control over their content and marketing ended with the late 1970s. Corporate artists and repertoire staff exerted an increasing amount of control over the creative process that had previously belonged to the artists, and established acts were pressured to create music with simpler harmony and song structures and fewer changes in meter. A number of symphonic pop bands, such as Supertramp, 10cc, the Alan Parsons Project and the Electric Light Orchestra, brought the orchestral-style arrangements into a context that emphasised pop singles while allowing for occasional instances of exploration. Jethro Tull, Gentle Giant and Pink Floyd opted for a harder sound in the style of arena rock.

Few new progressive rock bands formed during this era, and those who did found that record labels were not interested in signing them. The short-lived supergroup U.K. was a notable exception since its members had established reputations; they produced two albums that were stylistically similar to previous artists and did little to advance the genre. Part of the genre's legacy in this period was its influence on other styles, as several European guitarists brought a progressive rock approach to heavy metal and laid the groundwork for progressive metal. Michael Schenker, of UFO; and Uli Jon Roth, who replaced Schenker in Scorpions, expanded the modal vocabulary available to guitarists. Roth studied classical music with the intent of using the guitar in the way that classical composers used the violin. Finally, the Dutch-born and classically trained Alex and Eddie Van Halen formed Van Halen, featuring ground-breaking whammy-bar, tapping and cross-picking guitar performances that influenced "shred" music in the 1980s.

Commercialisation

Some established artists moved towards music that was simpler and more commercially viable. Arena rock bands like Journey, Kansas, Styx, GTR, ELO and Foreigner either had begun as progressive rock bands or included members with strong ties to the genre. These groups retained some of the song complexity and orchestral-style arrangements, but they moved away from lyrical mysticism in favour of more conventional themes such as relationships. These radio-friendly groups have been called "prog lite". Genesis transformed into a successful pop act, the prog supergroup Asia (consisting of members of Yes, King Crimson, and ELP) scored a number-one album in 1982, and a re-formed Yes released the relatively mainstream 90125 (1983), which yielded their only US number-one single, "Owner of a Lonely Heart". One band who remained successful into the 1980s while maintaining a progressive approach was Pink Floyd, who released The Wall late in 1979. The album, which brought punk anger into progressive rock, was a huge success and was later filmed as Pink Floyd – The Wall.

Post-punk and post-progressive

Punk and progressive rock were not necessarily as opposed as is commonly believed. Both genres reject commercialism, and punk bands did see a need for musical advancement. Author Doyle Green noted that post-punk emerged as "a kind of 'progressive punk. Post-punk artists rejected the high cultural references of 1960s rock artists like the Beatles and Bob Dylan as well as paradigms that defined rock as "progressive", "art", or "studio perfectionism". In contrast to punk rock, it balances punk's energy and skepticism with art school consciousness, Dadaist experimentalism, and atmospheric, ambient soundscapes. World music, especially African and Asian traditions, was also a major influence. Progressive rock's impact was felt in the work of some post-punk artists, although they tended not to emulate classical rock or Canterbury groups but rather Roxy Music, King Crimson, and krautrock bands, particularly Can. Punishment of Luxury's music borrowed from both progressive and punk rock, whilst Alternative TV, who were fronted by the founder of the influential punk fanzine Sniffin' Glue Mark Perry, toured and released a split live album with Gong offshoot Here & Now.

The term "post-progressive" identifies progressive rock that returns to its original principles while dissociating from 1970s progressive rock styles, and may be located after 1978. Martin credits Roxy Music's Brian Eno as the sub-genre's most important catalyst, explaining that his 1973–77 output merged aspects of progressive rock with a prescient notion of new wave and punk. New wave, which surfaced around 1978–79 with some of the same attitudes and aesthetic as punk, was characterised by Martin as "progressive" multiplied by "punk". Bands in the genre tended to be less hostile towards progressive rock than the punks, and there were crossovers, such as Fripp and Eno's involvement with Talking Heads, and Yes' replacement of Rick Wakeman and Jon Anderson with the pop duo the Buggles. When King Crimson reformed in 1981, they released an album, Discipline, which Macan says "inaugurated" the new post-progressive style. The new King Crimson line-up featured guitarist and vocalist Adrian Belew, who also collaborated with Talking Heads, playing live with the band and featuring on their 1980 album Remain in Light. According to Martin, Talking Heads also created "a kind of new-wave music that was the perfect synthesis of punk urgency and attitude and progressive-rock sophistication and creativity. A good deal of the more interesting rock since that time is clearly 'post-Talking Heads' music, but this means that it is post-progressive rock as well."

Neo-progressive rock

A second wave of progressive rock bands appeared in the early 1980s and have since been categorised as a separate "neo-progressive rock" subgenre. These largely keyboard-based bands played extended compositions with complex musical and lyrical structures. Several of these bands were signed by major record labels, including Marillion, IQ, Pendragon and Pallas. Most of the genre's major acts released debut albums between 1983 and 1985 and shared the same manager, Keith Goodwin, a publicist who had been instrumental in promoting progressive rock during the 1970s. The previous decade's bands had the advantage of appearing during a prominent countercultural movement that provided them with a large potential audience, but the neo-progressive bands were limited to a relatively niche demographic and found it difficult to attract a following. Only Marillion and Saga experienced international success.

Neo-progressive bands tended to use Peter Gabriel-era Genesis as their "principal model". They were also influenced by funk, hard rock and punk rock. The genre's most successful band, Marillion, suffered particularly from accusations of similarity to Genesis, although they used a different vocal style, incorporated more hard rock elements, and were very influenced by bands including Camel and Pink Floyd. Authors Paul Hegarty and Martin Halliwell have pointed out that the neo-progressive bands were not so much plagiarising progressive rock as they were creating a new style from progressive rock elements, just as the bands of a decade before had created a new style from jazz and classical elements. Author Edward Macan counters by pointing out that these bands were at least partially motivated by a nostalgic desire to preserve a past style rather than a drive to innovate.

1990s–2000s

Third wave

A third wave of progressive rock bands, who can also be described as a second generation of neo-progressive bands,  emerged in the 1990s. The use of the term "progressive" to describe groups that follow in the style of bands from ten to twenty years earlier is somewhat controversial, as it has been seen as a contradiction of the spirit of experimentation and progress. These new bands were aided in part by the availability of personal computer-based recording studios, which reduced album production expenses, and the Internet, which made it easier for bands outside of the mainstream to reach widespread audiences. Record stores specialising in progressive rock appeared in large cities.

The shred music of the 1980s was a major influence on the progressive rock groups of the 1990s. Some of the newer bands, such as the Flower Kings, Spock's Beard and Glass Hammer, played a 1970s-style symphonic prog, but with an updated sound. A number of them began to explore the limits of the CD in the way that earlier groups had stretched the limits of the vinyl LP.

Progressive metal

Progressive rock and heavy metal have similar timelines. Both emerged from late-1960s psychedelia to achieve great early-1970s success despite a lack of radio airplay and support from critics, then faded in the mid-to-late 1970s and experienced revivals in the early 1980s. Each genre experienced a fragmentation of styles at this time, and many metal bands from the new wave of British heavy metal – most notably Iron Maiden – onwards displayed progressive rock influences. Progressive metal reached a point of maturity with Queensrÿche's 1988 concept album Operation: Mindcrime, Voivod's 1989 Nothingface, which featured abstract lyrics and a King Crimson-like texture, and Dream Theater's 1992 Images and Words.

Progressive rock elements appear in other metal subgenres. Black metal is conceptual by definition, due to its prominent theme of questioning the values of Christianity. Its guttural vocals are sometimes used by bands who can be classified as progressive, such as Mastodon, Mudvayne and Opeth. Symphonic metal is an extension of the tendency towards orchestral passages in early progressive rock. Progressive rock has also served as a key inspiration for genres such as post-rock, post-metal and avant-garde metal, math rock, power metal and neo-classical metal.

New prog

New prog describes the wave of progressive rock bands in the 2000s who revived the genre. According to Entertainment Weeklys Evan Serpick: "Along with recent success stories like System of a Down and up-and-comers like the Dillinger Escape Plan, Lightning Bolt, Coheed and Cambria, and the Mars Volta create incredibly complex and inventive music that sounds like a heavier, more aggressive version of '70s behemoths such as Led Zeppelin and King Crimson."

2010s
The Progressive Music Awards were launched in 2012 by the British magazine Prog to honour the genre's established acts and to promote its newer bands. Honorees, however, are not invited to perform at the awards ceremony, as the promoters want an event "that doesn't last three weeks".

2020s 
Progressive rock as a genre continues into the 2020s with existing bands like Yes, Marillion, Porcupine Tree and Magenta, along with more recently notable bands like Riverside and Zen Carnival creating new music centered around the style.

Festivals
Many prominent progressive rock bands got their initial exposure at large rock festivals that were held in Britain during the late 1960s and early 1970s. King Crimson made their first major appearance at the 1969 Hyde Park free concert, before a crowd estimated to be as large as 650,000, in support of the Rolling Stones. Emerson, Lake & Palmer debuted at the 1970 Isle of Wight Festival, at which Supertramp, Family and Jethro Tull also appeared. Jethro Tull were also present at the 1969 Newport Jazz Festival, the first year in which that festival invited rock bands to perform. Hawkwind appeared at many British festivals throughout the 1970s, although they sometimes showed up uninvited, set up a stage on the periphery of the event, and played for free.

Renewed interest in the genre in the 1990s led to the development of progressive rock festivals. ProgFest, organised by Greg Walker and David Overstreet in 1993, was first held in UCLA's Royce Hall, and featured Sweden's Änglagård, the UK's IQ, Quill and Citadel. CalProg was held annually in Whittier, California during the early 2000s. The North East Art Rock Festival, or NEARfest, held its first event in 1999 in Bethlehem, Pennsylvania and held annual sold-out concerts until 2012's NEARfest Apocalypse, which featured headliners U.K. and Renaissance. Other festivals include the annual ProgDay (the longest-running and only outdoor progressive music festival) in Chapel Hill, North Carolina, the annual Rites of Spring Festival (RoSfest) in Sarasota, Florida, The Rogue Independent Music Festival in Atlanta, Georgia, Baja Prog in Mexicali, Mexico, ProgPower USA in Atlanta, Georgia, ProgPower Europe in Baarlo, Netherlands, and ProgStock in Rahway, NJ, which held its first event in 2017. Progressive Nation tours were held in 2008 and 2009 with Dream Theater as the headline act. "Night of the Prog" in Sankt Goarshausen, Germany, is an established European progressive rock festival held every July during 2–3 days for 12 years.

Reception
The genre has received both critical acclaim and criticism throughout the years. Progressive rock has been described as parallel to the classical music of Igor Stravinsky and Béla Bartók. This desire to expand the boundaries of rock, combined with some musicians' dismissiveness toward mainstream rock and pop, dismayed critics and led to accusations of elitism. Its intellectual, fantastic and apolitical lyrics, and shunning of rock's blues roots, were abandonments of the very things that many critics valued in rock music. Progressive rock also represented the maturation of rock as a genre, but there was an opinion among critics that rock was and should remain fundamentally tied to adolescence, so rock and maturity were mutually exclusive. Criticisms over the complexity of their music provoked some bands to create music that was even more complex.

Most of the musicians involved were male, as was the case for most rock of the time, Female singers were better represented in progressive folk bands, who displayed a broader range of vocal styles than the progressive rock bands with whom they frequently toured and shared band members.

British and European audiences typically followed concert hall behaviour protocols associated with classical music performances, and were more reserved in their behaviour than audiences for other forms of rock. This confused musicians during US tours, as they found American audiences less attentive and more prone to outbursts during quiet passages.

These aspirations towards high culture reflect progressive rock's origins as a music created largely by upper- and middle-class, white-collar, college-educated males from Southern England. The music never reflected the concerns of or was embraced by working-class listeners, except in the US, where listeners appreciated the musicians' virtuosity. Progressive rock's exotic, literary topics were considered particularly irrelevant to British youth during the late 1970s, when the nation suffered from a poor economy and frequent strikes and shortages. Even King Crimson leader Robert Fripp dismissed progressive rock lyrics as "the philosophical meanderings of some English half-wit who is circumnavigating some inessential point of experience in his life". Bands whose darker lyrics avoided utopianism, such as King Crimson, Pink Floyd and Van der Graaf Generator, experienced less critical disfavour.

"I wasn't a big fan of most of what you'd call progressive rock", remarked Floyd guitarist David Gilmour. "I'm like Groucho Marx: I don't want to belong to any club that would have me for a member." Ian Anderson, the frontman of Jethro Tull, commented:
I still like the original term that comes from 1969: progressive rock – but that was with a small "p" and a small "r". Prog Rock, on the other hand, has different connotations – of grandeur and pomposity ... Some of it was a little bit overblown, but in the case of much of the music, it was absolutely spot on.While music fans for years have declared progressive rock to be dead, the scene is still active with many sub-genres.

List of progressive rock artists

See also

 British folk rock
 Free jazz
 List of musical works in unusual time signatures 
 Minimal music
 Musique concrète
 Second Viennese School
 Serialism
 Third stream
 Timeline of progressive rock
 :Category:Progressive rock record labels

Notes

References

Sources

Bibliography

 
 
 
 
 
 
 
 
 
 
 
 
 
 
 
 
 
 
 
 
 
 
 
 *

Further reading

 Lucky, Jerry. The Progressive Rock Files. Burlington, Ontario: Collector's Guide Publishing, Inc (1998), 304 pages,  (paperback). Gives an overview of progressive rock's history as well as histories of the major and underground bands in the genre.
 Lucky, Jerry. The Progressive Rock Handbook. Burlington, Ontario: Collector's Guide Publishing, Inc. (2008), 352 pages,  (paperback). Reviews hundreds of progressive rock bands and lists their recordings. Also provides an updated overview, similar to The Progressive Rock Files.
 Snider, Charles. The Strawberry Bricks Guide To Progressive Rock, 3rd Edition. Chicago, Ill.: Kindle Direct Publishing (2020) 572 pages,  (paperback). A veritable record guide to progressive rock, with band histories, musical synopses and critical commentary, all presented in the historical context of a timeline.
 Stump, Paul. The Music's All That Matters: A History of Progressive Rock. London: Quartet Books Limited (1997), 384 pages,  (paperback). Smart telling of the history of progressive rock focusing on English bands with some discussion of American and European groups. Takes you from the beginning to the early 1990s.
 Weingarten, Marc. Yes Is The Answer: (And Other Prog-Rock Tales). Barnacle Book/Rare Bird Books (2013), 280 pages, . Defense of the genre.
 Yfantis, Vasileios. Is Prog Rock Really Progressive?. CreateSpace Independent Publishing Platform (2020), 119 pages, . Exploring the evolution and the future of the genre.

 
British rock music genres
British styles of music
American rock music genres
American styles of music
Rock